The Kangaroo Flat Football Netball Club is an Australian rules football and netball club based in the Bendigo suburb of Kangaroo Flat, Victoria.

The club teams currently compete in the Bendigo Football Netball League.

History
Kangaroos Flat spent much of the 20th century in the Bendigo Football Association and were premiers in 1923, 1926, 1948 and 1955. They joined the Golden City Football League (GCFL) in 1960 and won a premiership in their first season, with a one-point grand final win over White Hills

The GCFL merged with the BFL before the 1981 season to form the Bendigo-Golden City Football League and Kangaroo Flat were admitted into the second division. They were promoted to the first division in 1982 and the following year the name of the competition was reverted to the Bendigo Football League.

Kangaroos Flat were BFL premiers for the first and only time in 1996 when they defeated Kyneton 18.18.126 to 15.20.110. The club also made the grand final in 2000 but lost to Castlemaine by 12 points, despite having three more scoring shots.

Premierships
 Bendigo Football League (1): 1996

Notable players
Phil Carman (Collingwood Best and Fairest winner who was playing coach of Kangaroo Flat in 1985)
Nathan Chapman (Brisbane Bears, Brisbane Lions & Hawthorn player who was recruited from Kangaroo Flat)
Brett Gloury
Graeme Robertson (Carlton & Richmond player who was recruited from Kangaroo Flat)
Ty Zantuck (Essendon & Richmond defender who played with Kangaroo Flat in 2007)

References

External links
 Official Twitter

Sports clubs established in 1862
Australian rules football clubs established in 1862
Bendigo Football League clubs
1862 establishments in Australia
Netball teams in Victoria (Australia)